Linda Reksten is an American politician from Montana. She is a Republican member of the Montana House of Representatives for district 12.

References

Republican Party members of the Montana House of Representatives
People from Polson, Montana
Living people
1951 births